The Copa Master de Supercopa was a football competition contested by clubs that had previously won the Supercopa Libertadores. It was organized by CONMEBOL and only played in 1992 and 1995. A third edition was scheduled to be played in 1998 but the lack of sponsors delayed the event and eventually was cancelled

The format of the tournament was different in both editions. The first edition in 1992 featured all 4 champions at the time. It was played in Buenos Aires and won by Boca Juniors. The second edition was to be played in 1994 but moved to 1995. Only two eligible teams accepted the invitation to play. The cup was played over two legs and won by Cruzeiro.

The winners of the competitions were also given the chance to participate in a following-season grand super cup called the Copa de Oro. This competition was played three times. The first two competitions featured the respective Copa Master de Supercopa champion; however, as no Copa Master de Supercopa was contested in 1996, the vacant berth for the 1996 Copa de Oro went to the 1996 Copa Master de CONMEBOL champion.

1992 Supercopa Masters

The 1992 Supercopa Masters featured the four previous winners of the time. It was played in Buenos Aires at Estadio José Amalfitani.

Participants

Bracket
{{Round4-with third
|27 May – Buenos Aires| Boca Juniors|1| Olimpia|0
|29 May - Buenos Aires| Racing|1 (1)| Cruzeiro (pen)|1 (3)|31 May – Buenos Aires| Boca Juniors|2| Cruzeiro|1
|31 May – Buenos Aires| Olimpia|2'| Racing|1
}}

1995 Supercopa Masters

The 1995 Supercopa Masters was a two-legged match between two previous Supercopa Sudamericana champions. It was to be played in 1994 but was postponed until 1995.

Participants

First leg

Second legCruzeiro won 1–0 on aggregate.''

1998 Supercopa Masters
The 1998 Supercopa Masters was to feature all previous Supercopa Sudamericana winners. It was to be played between 28 May and 7 June in Avellaneda, Argentina but was postponed due to a lack of sponsors. It was to be played after the World Cup but was later dropped.

Participants

Performance by club

See also
Copa de Oro
Copa Master de CONMEBOL
Copa Libertadores
Supercopa Libertadores

External links
RSSSF

Defunct CONMEBOL club competitions
Supercopa Libertadores
1992 in South American football
1995 in South American football
1998 in South American football